North Sulawesi is a province of Indonesia. It is located on the Minahasa Peninsula of the island of Sulawesi, south of the Philippines and southeast of Sabah, Malaysia. It borders the Philippine province of Davao Occidental and Soccsksargen regions of the Philippines to the north, the Maluku Sea to the east, Gorontalo and Celebes Sea to the west and the Gulf of Tomini to the southwest. With Miangas, it is the northernmost province of Indonesia.

The province's capital and largest city is Manado, which is also the main gateway and the economic center of the province. Other major towns includes Tomohon and Bitung in the northern (Minahasa) half of the province, and Kotamobagu in the southern (Bolaang Mongondow) half. Most geologic conditions in the province are consisted mainly of young volcanic regions, with numerous eruptions and many active volcanic cones that adorn the central Minahasa, Bolaang Mongondow and Sangihe Islands.

North Sulawesi in the past was an area of potential spices, rice and gold which became a battleground for the interests of economic hegemony between the Portuguese, Spanish, Dutch and the Kingdoms around this area, which ultimately led to political and military struggles. The past of this region also became the trading route between west and east and the spread of Christianity, Islam and belief or religion brought by Chinese merchants. The Portuguese first landed on the area at the 16th century. Following decades of war between the Portuguese, the Spanish and the Dutch to control the area, the area ultimately fell to the Dutch at the 17th century. The Dutch ruled the area for three centuries, before being ousted by the Japanese on the eve of World War II. Following the Japanese surrender in 1945, the Dutch briefly regained possession of the area, before finally leaving for real in 1949, following the Round Table Conference, in which the Dutch recognized the newly created United States of Indonesia (RIS). Thus, North Sulawesi was incorporated into the territory of the State of East Indonesia (NIT). Because it was not in accordance with the will of the people, NIT was finally dissolved and then merged into the Republic of Indonesia. On 17 August 1950, the RIS was officially disbanded and then re-formed as the unitary state of the Republic of Indonesia. The island of Sulawesi was governed briefly as a single province, before being separated into several different provinces. Thus, the province of North Sulawesi was created on 14 August 1959. The western half of this area (as that time forming the Gorontalo Regency and newly formed Boalemo Regency) was separated from North Sulawesi on 5 December 2000 and established as the province of Gorontalo.

Etymology
The area around North Sulawesi used to be called Minahasa. The name is still used sometimes to refer to the province. The word Minahasa is etymologically derived from the words Mina-Esa (Minaesa) or Maesa which means being one or uniting, meaning hope to unite various sub-ethnic groups of Minahasa consisting of Tontemboan, Tombulu, Tonsea, Tolour (Tondano), Tonsawang, Ponosakan, Pasan and Bantik. The word "Minahasa" itself was only used during the colonial era. "Minahasa" is generally interpreted as "having become one". Based on several historical documents, the word "Minahasa" is firstly used by J.D. Schierstein, the Dutch regent of Manado, in his report to the Governor of Maluku on 8 October 1789. The word "Minahasa" in his report is defined as Landraad or "State Council" or "Regional Council".

History

Pre-Colonial Era
Archaeological research has revealed signs of human life in North Sulawesi from 30,000 years ago, based on evidence in the cave Liang Sarru on the island of Salibabu. Other evidence shows life about 6,000 years ago on the Passo Hillside Site in Kakas District and 4,000 years ago to early AD at the Liang Tuo Mane'e cave in Arangkaa on Karakelong Island.

Colonial Period
At the end of the 16th century, the Portuguese and Spanish arrived in North Sulawesi. When Europeans arrived, the Ternate Sultanate had influence in North Sulawesi, frequented by Bugis traders from South Sulawesi. The wealth of Minahasa's natural resources made Manado a strategic port for European traders going to and from Maluku. The Portuguese were the first to arrive in North Sulawesi, a Portuguese ship anchored on an island off Manado in the Kingdom of Manado in 1521. The northern islands of the peninsula were under the control of the Sultanate of Maguindanao during the time. The Spanish ship docked on the island of Talaud and Siau, on to Ternate. The Portuguese built a fort at Amurang. Spain built a Fort in Manado, giving Spain control of the Minahasa Peninsula. Resistance against Spanish occupation culminated in 1660–1664. Dutch ships landed in Manado City in 1660, assisting the Minahasa Confederation against Spain. The members of the Minahasa Confederation entered into a Trade Agreement with the VOC. This trade cooperation agreement gave the VOC monopoly on trade, gradually imposing its will, eventually leading to the 1700s resistance in Ratahan, culminating in the Dutch Minahasa-War in 1809–1811 at Tondano.

Spain had colonized the Philippines and made  Minahasa a coffee plantation with imported South American coffee because of its fertile land. Manado was further developed by Spain to become a center of coffee trade for Chinese merchants. In the 16th century one of the first Indo-Eurasian communities in the archipelago appeared in Manado. The first king of Manado, Muntu Untu (1630) was half Spanish. Spain then handed over Minahasa to the Portuguese in exchange for 350,000 ducats in a treaty. The rulers of Minahasa sent Supit, Pa'at, and Lontoh to ally with the Dutch to expel the Portuguese from Minahasa. In 1655 they excelled, building their own fortress in 1658 and drove out the last Portuguese a few years later.

By the beginning of the 17th century the Dutch had overthrown the sultanate of Ternate, and began to gain influence from Spain and Portugal. In 1677 the Dutch conquered the Sangir archipelago, two years later, Robert Padtbrugge, the governor of Maluku, visited Manado. His arrival resulted in an agreement with the Minahasan chiefs who led to Dutch domination for the next 300 years although the direct rule by the Dutch only began in 1870. The Dutch helped unify the Minahasa confederation, and in 1693. Dutch influence flourished with the spreading of Christianity and European culture in the land of Minahasa. The missionary schools in Manado in 1881 were one of the first attempts of mass education in Indonesia, providing an opportunity for graduates to find employment in the civil service, military, and high positions in the Dutch East Indies government. Minahasa relations with the Dutch were often poor. Causing a war between the Dutch and Tondano in 1807 and 1809. Eventually the Dutch and Minahasa became very close, with Minahasa often referred to as the 12th Dutch province. In 1947, some Manadonese formed a political movement of Twapro, short for Twaalfde Provincie (Twelfth Province) who appealed for formal integration of Minahasa into the Kingdom of the Netherlands.

Independence
During Japanese occupation of the Dutch East Indies the Allies bombed Manado greatly in 1945. During the Indonesian War of Independence, there was a split between pro-Indonesian and pro-Dutch residents. The appointment of Sam Ratulangi as the first governor of Sulawesi then succeeded in winning Minahasan support to the Republic of Indonesia. After Indonesian independence, Indonesia was divided into 8 provinces, and Sulawesi was one of these provinces. In 1946 the State of East Indonesia was formed in Sulawesi, and later became a state within the United States of Indonesia. The State of East Indonesia was dissolved, and merged into the Republic of Indonesia as part of a then unified Sulawesi Province.

In March 1957, Sulawesi military leaders held a confrontation with the central government, with demands for greater regional autonomy. They called for more active development, a fairer distribution of taxes, assistance against Abdul Kahar Muzakkar's rebellion in South Sulawesi, and a central government cabinet headed by Sukarno and Mohammad Hatta in balance. At first the movement of the 'Permesta' (Charter of the Struggle of the Universe) was merely a movement of reform rather than a separatist movement.

Negotiations between the central government and Sulawesi military leaders prevented violence in South Sulawesi, but Minahasan leaders were not satisfied with the outcome of the agreement and the movement broke out. Fearful of southern dominance, Minahasan leaders declared their own North Sulawesi autonomous state in June 1957. At that time the central government had controlled South Sulawesi, but in the North there were no strong figures of the central government and there were rumors that the United States was arming the PRRI rebellion in Sumatra, which has links with Minahasan leaders.

The possibility of foreign intervention prompted the central government to request military assistance from southern Sulawesi. The Permesta forces were later removed from Central Sulawesi, Gorontalo, Sangihe Islands, and Morotai in Moluccas. The United States then halted resistance, and in June 1958 central government forces landed in Minahasa. The Permesta uprising ended in mid-1961.

The effects of the Sumatra and Sulawesi rebellions  was ultimately counterproductive, with central government authority increasing while regional autonomy weakened, radical nationalism strengthened than pragmatic moderation, communist party power and Sukarno increased while Mohammad Hatta was weakened, with the establishing of Guided Democracy in 1958. But the demands of the Minahasa peoples for the province of their own would not end, and in 1964 the People's Representative Council enacted Law no. 13 officially creating the province of North Sulawesi, with Manado as provincial seat. 14 August 1959 was designated as the anniversary of the province.

Since the 1998 reforms, the Indonesian government has begun to adopt laws that enhanced regional autonomy.

Environment

Climate
Climate areas of North Sulawesi include tropical ones affected by muzon winds. In the months of November to April the West winds bring rain on the north coast, whereas in May to October a dry south wind changes. Temperatures are at every level up to the height of the cool as the city area Tomohon, Langowan in Minahasa Regency, Modoinding in Minahasa Selatan Regency, Kotamobagu city, and Modayag and Pasi in Bolaang Mongondow Regency. The area that receives the most rainfall is the Minahasa area. Temperatures average .

The air humidity was 73.4%. However, the temperature is also affected by the altitude of the place above sea level.

Geography

The province of North Sulawesi is located in the northern peninsula of Sulawesi Island and is one of three provinces in Indonesia which has geoposition, geostrategy and geopolitical advantages and is located on the Pacific Rim. The other two provinces are North Sumatra and Aceh Special Region. Viewed from geographical location, North Sulawesi is located at 0.30–4.30 North Latitude (Lu) and 121–127 East Longitude (BT). The position of the peninsula stretches from east to west with the northernmost regions are the Sangihe and Talaud Islands. The archipelago is adjacent to neighboring Philippines. The area of North Sulawesi has boundaries:

Most of the mainland area of North Sulawesi Province consists of mountains and hills interspersed by the valleys that make up the land. Some mountains in North Sulawesi are Mount Klabat in North Minahasa, Mount Lokon, Mount Mahawu in Tomohon, Mount Soputan in Southeast Minahasa, Mount Dua Saudara in Bitung, Mount Awu, Mount Space, Mount Karangketang, Mount Dalage, in Sangihe and Talaud, Mount Ambang, Mount Gambula and Mount Batu Balawan.

The lakes in this area potentially have economic value for the development of the field of tourism, irrigation and energy. In general, rivers are used for various purposes, among others, for irrigation as well as a source of electricity and drinking water sources. The rivers are Tondano River, Poigar River, Ranoyapo River, Talawaan River in Minahasa. Other major rivers are located in Bolmong and Bolmut namely Dumoga River, Sangkub River, Ongkaw River.

Along the coast of North Sulawesi, both on the mainland coast and on the coast of the islands, there are several headlands (Indonesian: Tanjung) and bays (Indonesian: Teluk). Some of the prominent headlands are Tanjun Atep, Tanjung Pulisan, Tanjung Salimburung, Tanjung Kelapa in Minahasa. Tanjung Binta, Tanjung Dulang, Tanjung Flesko and Tanjung Tanango in Bolmong. While in Sangihe and Talaud namely Tanjung Binta, Tanjung Barurita, Tanjung Bulude, Tanjung Bunangkem, Tanjung Buwu and Tanjung Esang. The well-known bays of this region include Amurang Bay, Teluk Belang, Manado Bay, Kema Bay (Minahasa and Manado), Tombolata Bay, Taludaa Bay and Bolaang Telun (Bolmong), Manganitu Bay, Map Bay, Miulu Bay, Dago Bay and Ngalipeang Bay (Sangihe and Talaud). The cape and bay are known as places of trade and tourism.

The structure of the land in North Sulawesi in the form of Latosol covering  spread in several areas, among others: Tagulandang, Tamako, Manganitu, Kendahe, Tabukan Utara, Esang, Pineleng, Tomohon, Tombariri, Airmadidi, Kakas, Eris, Kombi, Tareran, Passi, Modayag, Pinolocian and Bolaang. Alluvial soil structure of  spread over several regions, including the Tabukan Tengah, Lirung, Likupang, Wori, Tombasian, Tenga, New Tompaso, Belang and Tondano.

Regosol soil structure covering  spread across several areas, among others, Klabat, Dua Saudara, Soputan and North Bitung, Dimembe, Airmadidi, Langowan, Tombasian, Tombatu and Tumpaan. Apart from the structure of the land mentioned, others including soil types complex covering an area of approximately 76.5 percent of total area of North Sulawesi province so that the area was fertile for agriculture.

Flora and Fauna
In general, the varieties of flora and fauna in North Sulawesi are similar to those in other parts of Indonesia, except for some animals not found in other areas such as Deer, Maleo, Taong, Mini Tarsius Spectrum in Bitung City Nature Reserve And Coelacanth off the coast of Manado. This area there are no wild animals except the type of snake and crocodile that there are not many.

In the sea off North Sulawesi, there are several species of fish, coral, and plankton. Several types of famous marine fish and is one source of foreign exchange, among others: tuna, skipjack, yellow tail, lobsters, and others. The condition of flora can be said that the mainland of North Sulawesi partly dominated by forest. In addition, there are many plantation crops such as coconut, nutmeg, and cloves.

Demographics
The slowest growing regency was that of the Sangihe Islands. In 2010, about 68% were Christian (predominantly Protestant with a sizable Catholic minority), one of the few exceptions in the predominantly Muslim Indonesia, due to the prominent Dutch missionary activity during the colonial era.  Also, because the Muslim-majority region of Gorontalo (then comprising a city and two regencies) was split off to form a new province in 2000. There are also Muslim, Hindu, and Buddhist minorities. The largest ethnic groups are the Minahasan in the north of the province and the Mongondow to the south.  The province's chief city is Manado with a population of 454,606 people according to the mid 2022 official estimate.

Religion

Most of the people of North Sulawesi adhere to Christianity, the next is Islam and then Hinduism. Christianity is the majority religion in those districts and cities of the Islands and Minahasa, while Islam is the majority religion in the districts and cities in the Bolaang Mongondow. Most of the Christians in North Sulawesi adhere to Protestantism, while significant minority Roman Catholic communities also exist in Manado and Bitung. Chinese folk religions such as Confucianism and Taoism also exist, which is mostly concentrated in Manado, which has a significant Chinese population. Manado also has a significant Judaism community. Currently, the only synagogue in Indonesia is located in Manado. There are an estimated 800 people in Manado who adhere to Judaism. As the Indonesian government only recognizes six religions and traditional faith, those who adhere to other religions or faiths can choose to put one of the officially recognized religions or traditional faith, or Kepercayaan Terhadap Tuhan Yang Maha Esa (Believe in One Almighty God) on their ID cards.

Ethnicity

The Minahasan is the dominant ethnic group in the province. They are the most populous ethnic group in the Minahasa Peninsula. They mostly lived in areas covering Bitung City, Manado City, Tomohon City, Minahasa Regency, North Minahasa Regency, South Minahasa Regency and Southeast Minahasa Regency. Other ethnic groups are the Bolaang Mongondow, Sangihe, Talaud and Siau. Ethnicity in North Sulawesi is more heterogeneous then other parts of Indonesia. The Minahasan and Bolaang Mongondow are spread almost throughout the region of North Sulawesi mainland. The Sangihe, Talaud and Siau mostly inhabit the Sangihe Islands, Talaud Island, and Lembeh Island, especially in coastal areas north, east and west of mainland North Sulawesi. The Bajau people are seafaring nomads who has migrated from the Sulu Archipelago in the Philippines, due to the conflict in Mindanao. They inhabits several coastal villages of North Sulawesi in the northern part of North Minahasa Regency.

In addition to the natives, North Sulawesi is also home to migrants. There are a significant Chinese population in North Sulawesi, especially around the city of Manado. The Chinese are also one of the first people to have contact with the local people before the Europeans came. According to the discovery of Chinese ancient letters in the Tompaso area, Minahasa shows the cultural interaction between the Chinese and Minahasa have existed since the Han dynasty. Most of the Chinese population in North Sulawesi are from the Hakka dialect group, while small numbers of Hokkien and Cantonese populations also exist.

Other ethnic groups such as the Javanese and the Sundanese also exist. They are mostly migrated from where they come from due to the Transmigration program enacted by the Dutch during the colonial era until the Suharto era. They generally live in urban areas, such as Manado and Bitung.

Language
Indonesian is the official language of the province, as well as of other parts of Indonesia. Official documents released by the provincial government as well as road signs are all written in Indonesia. However, Manado Malay is the lingua franca of the province. This language resembles Indonesian but with a distinct accent and dialect. Some of the vocabulary are derived from Dutch, Portuguese and other foreign languages. Manado Malay is often used for day-to-day communication between different ethnic groups. Minahasan languages are spoken by the Minahasan people. They are spread around the central and northern part of the province. In the Minahasa area, five (5) distinct languages are spoken: Tonsawang, Tontemboan, Toulour, Tonsea and Tombulu. To the south, the Mongondow language and the Gorontalo language are spoken. In the islands to the north which borders the Philippines, the Visayan languages are used by the local people.

Other languages spoken are Javanese, Sundanese and Balinese. They are mostly spoken by migrants coming from other parts of Indonesia. As Manado has a significant Chinese population, Hakka is also spoken by some Chinese people. Some other Chinese dialects are also spoken, such as Hokkien and Cantonese. English and Mandarin are widely understood in areas where there is a large tourism industry, such as the Bunaken National Park. Older generations tend to understand Dutch and Portuguese. People who lived in islands near the borders of the Philippines may understand Tagalog.

Administrative divisions

Following the separation of Central Sulawesi as a separate province in 1964, North Sulawesi was composed of four regencies - Minahasa, Sangihe Islands, Bolaang Mongondow and Gorontalo - and the independent city of Manado. The city of Bitung was separated from Minahasa Regency on 15 August 1990 to become a second independent city. On 4 October 1999 a new Boalemo Regency was created from part of Gorontalo Regency, but on 5 December 2000 both Gorontalo Regency and the new Boalemo Regency were split off from the province to become jointly a new Gorontalo Province. Further regencies were created from 2002 onwards - Talaud Islands on 10 April 2002 from part of Sangihe Islands Regency, North Minahasa on 18 December 2002 from part of Minahasa Regency, and South Minahasa - and the independent city of Tomohon - on 25 February 2003 from further parts of Minahasa Regency. Further new regencies followed on 2 January 2007 - North Bolaang Mongondow and the independent city of Kotamobagu from parts of Bolaang Mongondow Regency, the Sitaro Islands from part of Sangihe Islands Regency, and Southeast Minahasa from part of South Minahasa Regency. Two further regencies were created on 24 June 2008 from further parts of Bolaang Mongondow Regency - East Bolaang Mongondow and South Bolaang Mongondow.

The province is thus now divided into eleven regencies and four independent cities, listed below with their areas and their populations at the 2010 Census and 2020 Census, together with the official estimates as at mid 2022.

References

External links

  
 

 
Provinces of Indonesia
1959 establishments in Indonesia
States and territories established in 1959